Comedians in Cars Getting Coffee is an American talk-show web series directed and hosted by comedian Jerry Seinfeld. The series premiered on digital network Crackle on July 19, 2012. As of May 2015, it had been streamed nearly 100 million times. The series moved to Netflix in 2018 for the debut of its tenth season. Its eleventh season premiered on July 19, 2019. Seinfeld has since indicated that he may be done working on the series.

Episodes feature Seinfeld introducing a vintage car selected for a guest comedian, followed by a drive to a café or restaurant where they drink coffee. Episodes diverge from the format spontaneously, from making unplanned stops to interacting with members of the public.

Production

History
Seinfeld has stated that the roots of the concept traced to a DVD extra he made for his 2002 documentary Comedian along with a later trip he made after purchasing an old VW Beetle in New Mexico, subsequently filming the return trip to the east coast with a friend. Later, describing the birth of the series, Seinfeld said the series birth was "an experiment"—as "kind of a guess."

Prior to the development of the series, Seinfeld was told by leading social network advisers, including those at Facebook and Yahoo, that a show length exceeding five minutes had little chance of success on the web. Howard Schultz, coffee magnate and Chairman of Starbucks, turned down the opportunity to sponsor the show. Acura eventually sponsored the show, giving Seinfeld creative license with creating commercials and product placements.

The series premiered on Crackle on July 19, 2012. As of May 2015, it had been streamed nearly 100 million times. In January 2017, it was announced that the series would migrate to Netflix starting with the show's tenth season. The first nine seasons became available to stream on Netflix in January 2018. Excluded are the Super Bowl promotional episode with Jason Alexander and Wayne Knight reprising their respective roles of George Costanza and Newman from Seinfeld, a series of promotional videos featuring Michael Richards as fictional Crackle president Dick Corcoran and a spin-off series Single Shot (2014–2016), which compiled footage from various episodes to focus on a more narrow subject.

The series' eleventh season premiered on July 19, 2019. After hinting in mid-2020 that he may be done working on the series, Seinfeld stated in late 2021 that "I think I'm going to put that volume on the shelf." He elaborated that "It was a lot of fun and I got to meet ... a lot of those people who I had not met. We're friends now." The first episode filmed and last episode released feature Barry Marder and the same 1966 Porsche 356.

Format
Episodes are estimated to cost roughly $100,000, with guests being paid in cash and the initial raw shoot lasting on average three and a half hours, which is then edited over a two-week period down to a 12 to 20-minute episode. The process uses a lean production staff, involves a minimum of network interaction and is designed as an edited and unscripted talk show without an audience that can be comfortably watched on a smartphone.

The show is formatted around the car drive and "movement," as Seinfeld believed that "when attempting to show the meandering, silly and sometimes deep conversations that comedians share, you have to remove the audience to keep the participants from dropping into their acts," adding that "part of what makes the show watchable is that it's always moving. There's no narrative [to] drive the story. We know what happens. We know they're going to get coffee. You need a kinetic energy to move it along. Moving people around keeps them awake."

The format is similar to Robert Llewellyn's Carpool, which ran for over 100 episodes between 2009 and 2011. In July 2019, Seinfeld apologized to Llewellyn for the similarity and for not previously being aware of his series.

Bob Einstein became the first repeat guest on the show, appearing in the first season and again in the ninth season. Two guests have had their appearances split into two episodes: Jimmy Fallon in the fifth season and Ricky Gervais in the eleventh season. Several episodes have featured multiple guests appearing together including: Carl Reiner and Mel Brooks, Colin Quinn and Mario Joyner, and Kathleen Madigan and Chuck Martin. Colleen Ballinger appeared in character as Miranda Sings as a guest on an episode.

Episodes

Season 1 (2012)

Season 2 (2013)

Season 3 (2014)

Season 4 (2014)

Season 5 (2014)
A series of bonus promotional videos featuring Michael Richards as Crackle president Dick Corcoran were released before and during this season.
Joan Rivers had been asked by Seinfeld to be the fifth season's first guest. However, she postponed her appearance due to a scheduled medical procedure. Rivers died as a result of that procedure.

Season 6 (2015)

Season 7 (2015–16)

Season 8 (2016)

Season 9 (2017)

Season 10 (2018)

Season 11 (2019)

Reception
Brian Lowry of Variety said that the series is the kind of short-form concept that feels stretched, even at 18 minutes. David Hinckley of The New York Daily News gave the series 3 out of 5 stars. Mike Hale of The New York Times said: "The [series' segments] ... are presented in a clean, elegant template with a studiously casual pencil-drawn logo. And the filming and editing are, if you break them down, impressively complex and artful for a Web series."

The New York Timess Anand Giridharadas critiqued the show as being out of touch with the everyman and more of a showcase of Seinfeld's wealth. Giridharadas wrote: "The democracy of observational humor has become, in Mr. Seinfeld's reincarnation, an oligarchy of mutual admiration." Other publications have been more positive in their opinion. The New York Daily News wrote of the show's format and first three seasons that, "It all sounds random, which it is and trivial, which it is and isn’t. In the end, the fun is contagious." Newsday then graded season four of the series with an "A".

Among the show's highlights is the episode with then-president Barack Obama. The episode begins with Seinfeld knocking on the White House windows, which he later would say "was the peak of my entire existence." Critics and audiences alike praised the episode for "what could have easily come off as stilted, manufactured dribble miraculously contains a comedic spark" and for its "charming and relaxed natural moments of playfulness," as well as the chemistry between the two.

The Guardian's Stuart Heritage reviewed the later seasons of the show as degraded in quality, with the Christoph Waltz episode representing a low point that was "a betrayal of the premise [and] a slab of flabby filler to boot." With the move to Netflix, a subscription service, Heritage expected an increase of quality rather than episodes that were "exactly the same in terms of look and feel as the ones that came before," and further that the series feels more like "a product" with less creativity regarding its selection of guests.

Awards and nominations 
The show has earned numerous Primetime Emmy Award nominations and has won several Producers Guild awards.

Legacy
A variant cover for the first issue of the 2022 reboot of the Batman & Superman: World's Finest comic book series features Seinfeld driving the Batmobile with Superman in the passenger seat and Batman on the back of the car, all three holding coffees in the manner of the show.

References

External links
 
 
 Comedians in Cars Getting Coffee on TV.com

Crackle (streaming service) original programming
English-language Netflix original programming
2010s American comedy television series
2012 American television series debuts
Automotive television series
Automotive web series
Television series by Embassy Row (production company)
Television series by Sony Pictures Television
Shorty Award winners
Television series created by Jerry Seinfeld
American non-fiction web series